Emu Plains Correctional Centre, an Australian minimum security prison for females, is located on Old Bathurst Rd, Emu Plains, New South Wales.  The centre is operated by Corrective Services NSW an agency of the Department of Attorney General and Justice of the Government of New South Wales. The centre detains sentenced and unsentenced felons under New South Wales and/or Commonwealth legislation.

Facilities
Established as a working dairy farm in 1914, the Emu Plains Prison Farm accommodated male inmates as part of a process of rehabilitation through farming. The centre was remodelled in 1957 as Emu Plains Training Centre and again in 1976 as Emu Plains Detention Centre. In 1994, the centre was again remodelled and all male inmates were transferred to other correctional facilities, with the Emu Plain Correctional Centre created as a minimum security prison for women.
 
In 1996 a women's and children's program was established that permitted inmates to maintain closer contact with their children. The program allows some children to stay with their mother in custody and also allows inmates to make recordings of book readings for their children.

Inmates are employed in the dairy for dairy processing, and also up until recently, assisting in the breeding and training of assistance dogs to help people with disabilities. Inmates are encouraged to participate in a range of courses which are subject to change.
Emu Plains also runs a work release program assisting suitable inmates to gain employment within the community while still in custody and assisting them with adjustment to life in the community after release.

Notable prisoners
Anu Singhconvicted for the 1997 murder of her boyfriend.

See also

Punishment in Australia

References

External links
Emu Plains Correction Centre website

Prisons in Sydney
1914 establishments in Australia
Emu Plains, New South Wales